Panzerfaust is the fifth studio album by Norwegian black metal band Darkthrone, released in June 1995 by Moonfog Productions (Europe) and The End Records (North America). The track "Quintessence" featured lyrics by Varg Vikernes, their second and final album to do so. As with the previous album Transilvanian Hunger, all instruments on Panzerfaust were recorded solely by Fenriz on a 4-track recorder set up in his bedroom (dubbed "Necrohell Studios" by the band); with Nocturno Culto performing vocals on all songs except for the outro.

In October 2010, Panzerfaust was reissued by Peaceville Records as a two-disc edition, with the second disc featuring Fenriz discussing the making of the album and the subject matter of the songs. In this commentary, Fenriz cited Celtic Frost's Morbid Tales (1984), Bathory's Under the Sign of the Black Mark (1987), and Vader's Necrolust (1989) as key riff inspirations.

Track listing

Personnel 
 Nocturno Culto – lead vocals
 Fenriz – guitar, bass, drums, synths, spoken word vocals

References

Darkthrone albums
1995 albums
Norwegian-language albums